Brylcream Boulevard is a 1995 Belgo Dutch comedy film which was directed by Robbe De Hert.

Cast
Michael Pas as Robin De Hert
Frank Aendenboom as Joris Verbiest
Babette van Veen as Kathy Van Bloemendael
Hilde Heijnen as Jeanine
Gert-Jan Dröge as Johan de Pauw
Koen Onghena as Blondy
Oliver Windross as Rudy
Bart Slegers as Felix Zakowski
Stijn Meuris as Bernard
Eric Clerckx as Stafke
Patje de Neve as Perre
Ernst Löw as Jean Pierre de Bie
Blanka Heirman as Alice de Hert
Jaak Van Assche as Lou de Hert
Piet Balfoort as Minister

References

External links 
 

Belgian comedy films
1995 films
Films set in the 1950s
Films directed by Robbe De Hert
1990s Dutch-language films
Dutch comedy films